Central Park in New York City has thirty-six ornamental spans, most of which were built in the 1860s as part of the park's construction. No two bridges in the park are alike. There were three types of bridges and arches constructed in Central Park. The spans across the sunken "transverse" roads that carry crosstown traffic below the park were made of natural-looking schist, and are generally not counted as arches or bridges. "Ornamental Bridges or Archways" were larger spans integrated into the greater landscape and were made of brick, stone, or cast iron. The final category, "rustic" bridges, were smaller stone or log bridges and usually spanned small walkways or streams. Central Park had 39 bridges at its peak.

The bridges were devised as part of Frederick Law Olmsted and Calvert Vaux's proposal for Central Park, the Greensward Plan. Most of the spans were built in the 1860s. By 1872, there were thirty-three spans; six more spans were built before the end of the 19th century. Three of the original 39 bridges were removed in the 1930s.

Background

Development of Central Park
By the 1840s, members of the city's elite were publicly calling for the construction of a new large park in Manhattan. At the time, Manhattan's seventeen squares comprised a combined  of land, constituting less than one percent of Manhattan's total area. An initial bill to acquire Jones's Wood, a  tract of land on the Upper East Side, was nullified in 1851, and a subsequent bill to approve the purchase of Jones's Wood was also defeated in 1854. The second possible site for a large public park was a  area labeled Central Park, which was bounded by 59th and 106th Streets between Fifth and Eighth Avenues.

In July 1853, the New York State Legislature passed the Central Park Act, authorizing the purchase of the present-day site of Central Park. The initial plans for Central Park were devised by Egbert Ludovicus Viele, who had devised unofficial plans for the park in 1853. Viele's plan was disregarded by the Central Park commission,  who started a landscape design contest in April 1857 to find a suitable design for the park.

Acceptance of Greensward Plan
Central Park superintendent Frederick Law Olmsted worked with Calvert Vaux to create the "Greensward Plan", which was eventually decided as the winner of the contest. The Greensward Plan distinguished itself from many of the other designs in the contest by including four sunken "transverse" roadways, which carried crosstown traffic through Central Park and were not intended to be seen or heard from the rest of the park. The transverse roadways were the most difficult to construct, as they were to run below the rest of the park, but engineer J. H. Pieper devised several designs for bridges and retaining walls for each roadway.

Along with the transverse roads, the plan envisioned three categories of park paths: "carriage" roadways for pleasure vehicles; bridle paths for horses; and pedestrian walkways. These paths would cross each other, necessitating bridges and arches interspersed through the park, each with unique designs ranging from rugged rock spans to Neo-Gothic cast iron. Many of the bridges would be designed by Vaux.

Bridge types
There were three types of bridges and arches constructed in Central Park. The spans across the sunken transverse roads were made of natural-looking schist, with vaults of brick underneath; these were not included in the final bridge count. The other two types of bridges concerned crossings between the different types of paths in Central Park. "Ornamental Bridges or Archways" were larger spans integrated into the greater landscape and were made of brick, stone, or iron. Seven of the "ornamental" spans were made of iron; all except one of these bridges spanned bridle paths, the exception being the Bow Bridge, which spanned the Lake.

"Rustic" bridges were smaller and usually spanned small walkways or streams. There were six "rustic" wooden spans, as well as two stone spans (the Ramble and Riftstone Arches) that were sometimes considered to be rustic spans. Vaux and Jacob Wrey Mould made decisions on which materials to use in the spans. Vaux preferred to use bluestone, or brick mixed with granite and brownstone.

Initially, the bridges were all given numbers, mostly in the order that they were to be constructed. Most of the spans, except for the Bow Bridge, were designed to blend in with the surrounding environment, because Olmsted and Vaux wanted to maintain a pastoral ambiance within the park.

Construction
The initial plans called for seven bridges and two tunnels, as well as one masonry bridge and one footbridge. This number was later expanded to nineteen bridges, then to thirty-four and finally to thirty-nine. Most of the bridges were erected in the 1860s, during the initial construction of Central Park. The first spans were completed in 1859 and were mostly concentrated in the southern section of Central Park. Twenty-three bridges were completed before 1861, and eleven were completed from 1862 to 1865. Controversy arose in 1859 after it was found that the construction of Central Park had significant cost overrun, and the commissioners expressed concerns about the cost of the bridges' stone. This led to the approval of the "rustic" bridges in the northern section of Central Park.

By 1872, there were thirty-three spans. Inscope Arch, along with the original Gapstow Bridge and the now-demolished Outset Arch, were built in 1873 to alleviate traffic congestion. The three spans were built as per the suggestion of Olmsted and Vaux's landscape firm, which was no longer associated with Central Park at the time. Claremont and Mountcliff Arches, as well as Eagledale Bridge, were finished in 1890. The wooden Gapstow Bridge was replaced with a stone span in 1896. Of the thirty-nine arches and bridges that were ultimately built, thirty-five were designed by Vaux and Mould. Three spans were demolished in the 1930s: the Marble Arch, the Spur Rock Arch, and the Outset Arch.

Arches 
The width of the arch refers to the distance between abutments that form the walls of the vault underneath, and the length of the arch is the distance between the openings at either end of the vault. The length of the span refers to the distance between the two ends of the deck running overhead, and the width of the span is the same as the length of the arch. Bridges are designed by Calvert Vaux unless otherwise indicated. The arches and bridges are referred to by their names first, then the numbers originally assigned to them. The following listing excludes transverse arches and bridges, which do not count as ornamental spans.

Bridges 
The length of the span refers to the distance between the two ends of the deck running overhead, and the width of the span is the distance between the sidewalls or handrails on either side of the deck. Where applicable, the width of the arch refers to the distance between abutments that form the walls of the vault underneath, while the length of the arch is the distance between the openings at either end of the vault. Bridges are designed by Calvert Vaux unless otherwise indicated. The arches and bridges are referred to by their names first, then the numbers originally assigned to them.

Rustic bridges
There are also eight "rustic" bridges in Central Park, the majority of which were made of unpainted timber. Riftstone and Ramble Arches are excluded from this list, as they are already classified as arches. The other six rustic bridges are all wooden.

Former structures

References

Bibliography

External links
 

Arches and bridges
Central Park
Arches and bridges in Central Park
Arches and bridges in Central Park